Werner Gregoritsch (born 22 March 1958) is an Austrian football manager and former player. He manages the Austria U21 national team and has previously managed Kapfenberger SV, SV Mattersburg and Grazer AK.

Personal life
Gregoritsch's son, Michael, is the youngest goalscorer in the history of the Austrian Bundesliga. He scored his first goal at the age of 15 years and 361 days.

References

1958 births
Living people
Association football forwards
Austrian footballers
Austrian Football Bundesliga players
Grazer AK players
FC Linz players
First Vienna FC players
Austrian football managers
Grazer AK managers
SV Mattersburg managers
LASK managers
Kapfenberger SV managers